Kathleen Mildred Burk (born March 1946) is Professor Emerita of Modern and Contemporary History at University College London. Her field of research is international history, especially politics, diplomacy and finance.

Early life and career
Burk grew up in a California grape farming family. She has undergraduate degrees from University of California at Berkeley and Oxford University at St Hugh's College, and a D.Phil. from Oxford University, where she studied under A. J. P. Taylor. Her early books focused on economic diplomacy and were driven by her insight that “While governments come and go, the need for money is inexorable.”

After finishing her studies, she was Tutorial Assistant in Modern History at Dundee University (1976–77). From 1977–1980 she was as a Rhodes Research Fellow at Oxford. From 1980-1992 she was a Lecturer in History and Politics at Imperial College London. She started at University College London in 1990–1992, becoming Reader in Modern and Contemporary History in 1993 and a Professor in 1995. In the mid-nineties, only 7 per cent of the professors there were women.

A 2013 issue of the academic journal Diplomacy & Statecraft was devoted to essays in her honour. She is a fellow of the Norwegian Academy of Science and Letters.

Subject matter
Burk founded the journal Contemporary European History in 1992, taking the role of editor for the first 13 years. In the 1980s, with two colleagues she founded The Historians' Press which ran for 25 years.

In addition to her main field of research, Burk is a freelance writer on wine and has a diploma in wine and spirits from the London Wine & Spirit Education Trust.

In April 2021, Burk discussed the Franco-American Alliance on BBC Radio 4's In Our Time and has previously spoken on the programme about Congress of Vienna (2017), Thomas Paine's Common Sense pamphlet (2016), the California Gold Rush (2015), the War of 1812 (2013), Custer's last stand (2011), Thomas Edison (2010), Thoreau and the American Idyll (2009), the Statue of Liberty (2008) and the Pilgrim Fathers (2007).

Other work
She was on the governing body of Abingdon School from 2001 to 2013.

Writes for Wine Behind the Label.

Publications

References

1946 births
Living people
Academics of University College London
British women historians
Governors of Abingdon School
Members of the Norwegian Academy of Science and Letters
Women political scientists